Curling at the 2023 Winter World University Games took place at the Saranac Lake Civic Center in Saranac Lake, New York, United States. The event ran from Friday, January 13, 2023 to Saturday, January 21, 2023.

Medal summary

Medal table

Medallists

Men

Teams

The teams are listed as follows:

Round-robin standings
Final round-robin standings

Round-robin results
All draw times are listed in Eastern Time (UTC−05:00).

Draw 1
Friday, January 13, 19:00

Draw 2
Saturday, January 14, 14:00

Draw 3
Sunday, January 15, 9:00

Draw 4
Sunday, January 15, 19:00

Draw 5
Monday, January 16, 14:00

Draw 6
Tuesday, January 17, 9:00

Draw 7
Tuesday, January 17, 19:00

Draw 8
Wednesday, January 18, 14:00

Draw 9
Thursday, January 19, 9:00

Playoffs

Semifinals
Thursday, January 19, 19:00

Bronze medal game
Friday, January 20, 19:00

Final
Saturday, January 21, 14:00

Final standings

Women

Teams

The teams are listed as follows:

Round-robin standings
Final round-robin standings

Round-robin results
All draw times are listed in Eastern Time (UTC−05:00).

Draw 1
Friday, January 13, 14:00

Draw 2
Saturday, January 14, 9:00

Draw 3
Saturday, January 14, 19:00

Draw 4
Sunday, January 15, 14:00

Draw 5
Monday, January 16, 9:00

Draw 6
Monday, January 16, 19:00

Draw 7
Tuesday, January 17, 14:00

Draw 8
Wednesday, January 18, 9:00

Draw 9
Wednesday, January 18, 19:00

Playoffs

Semifinals
Thursday, January 19, 14:00

Bronze medal game
Friday, January 20, 14:00

Final
Saturday, January 21, 19:00

Final standings

References

External links
 
 
 Results book

2023 Winter World University Games
2023
2023 Winter World University Games
Winter World University Games